Robert Gordis (February 6, 1908 – January 3, 1992) was an American leading conservative rabbi. He founded the first Conservative Jewish day school, served as President of the Rabbinical Assembly and the Synagogue Council of America, and was a professor at Jewish Theological Seminary of America from 1940 to 1992.

He wrote one of the first pamphlets explaining Conservative ideology in 1946, and in 1988 he chaired the Commission on the Philosophy of Conservative Judaism which produced the official statement of Conservative ideology "Emet Ve-Emunah".

Gordis was the founding editor in 1951 of the quarterly journal Judaism.

Books 
 Koheleth -- The Man and his World: A Study of Ecclesiastes (Schocken Books, 1951)
 The Song of Songs: A Study, Modern Translation and Commentary (The Jewish Theological Seminary, 1954)
 The Book of Job: Commentary, New Translation, Special Studies ( Jewish Theological Seminary of America, 1978)
 Love and Sex: A Modern Jewish Perspective (Farrar Straus Giroux, 1978)

Awards 

 1979: National Jewish Book Award in the Jewish Thought category for Love and Sex: A Modern Jewish Perspective

References

External links

1908 births
1992 deaths
American Conservative rabbis
American Jewish theologians
Jewish Theological Seminary of America people
20th-century American rabbis